Town Hall 1972 is a live album by American jazz saxophonist Anthony Braxton recorded in 1972 at The Town Hall in New York City and originally released on the Japanese Trio label and rereleased on the hatART label as Town Hall (Trio & Quintet) 1972 in 1992.

Reception
The Allmusic review by Thom Jurek awarded the album 4 stars stating "The playing here is soulful and engaging throughout it features some crack improvisation".

Track listing
All compositions by Anthony Braxton except where noted.
 "Composition 6 N / Composition 6 (O)" – 18:18 
 "All The Things You Are" (Jerome Kern, Oscar Hammerstein II) – 14:12 
 "Composition 6 P I" – 13:46
 "Composition 6 P II" – 21:25

Personnel
Anthony Braxton – soprano saxophone, alto saxophone, soprano clarinet, clarinet, contrabass clarinet, flute, percussion
Dave Holland – bass
Phillip Wilson – drums (tracks 1 & 2)
John Stubblefield – tenor saxophone, flute, bass clarinet, gong, percussion (tracks 3 & 4)
Jeanne Lee – vocals (tracks 3 & 4)
Barry Altschul –  percussion, marimba (tracks 3 & 4)

References

Hathut Records live albums
Anthony Braxton live albums
1972 albums
Albums recorded at the Town Hall